The Romanian Open is a darts tournament that is run by the Romanian Darts Federation (Federația Română de Darts). It is played in a legs format.

History
The tournament was established in 2010 and has been run yearly since. RIDO has been televised in Romania by Sport.ro since 2011.

Accreditation
RIDO is a WDF Ranking 1 event for men and WDF Ranking 2 event for women, and a BDO Invitation Category B ranking event. RIDO grants entry to the following year's Winmau World Masters for both the men and women singles' winners.

List of winners

Men's

Women's

References

External links
 
 Romanian Darts Federation

 
Darts tournaments
International sports competitions hosted by Romania
Recurring sporting events established in 2010
2010 establishments in Romania